Diego Martínez (born August 6, 1993 in Mexico City) is a Mexican footballer. He currently plays for Cruz Azul.

Career
In 2011 Martínez was the winner of the 2nd season of Football Cracks, a reality show looking for players to realize their dreams of playing professional football, led by Zinedine Zidane and Enzo Francescoli.
As a result of winning the contest, Martínez won the right to play and train with Real Madrid Castilla.

External links
 Diego Football Cracks

1993 births
Living people
Mexican footballers
Cruz Azul footballers
Association football forwards